Shut Up and Kiss Me is the sixth studio album by the Canadian country music singer-songwriter Michelle Wright. It was released on May 28, 2002, on BMG Music Canada/RCA/ViK. Recordings.

The title track, "Shut Up and Kiss Me (Or Just Shut Up)", was later re-recorded in 2002, by Jamie Benson, the former vocalist of the British pop band Hepburn, for her album My Confession.

Track listing
 "I Surrender" (Eric Silver, Michelle Wright) – 3:39
 "Shut Up and Kiss Me or Just Shut Up" (Louise Hoffsten, Shelly Peiken, John Shanks) – 3:29
 "Still No Shangri-La" (Gerald O'Brien, Silver, Wright) – 4:39
 "Broken" (Russ DeSalvo, Arnie Roman, Wright) – 4:04
 "Every Time You Come Around" (Tommy Sims, Wright) – 3:40
 "Find It in New York" (Silver, Julie Wood) – 4:11
 "Thank You for Your Love" (Russ DeSalvo, Roman, Wright) – 4:02
 "Love Is the Only Way" (DeSalvo, Tanya Leah, Stephanie Lewis) – 4:08
 "Could You Be" (DeSalvo, Roman) – 4:29
 "Sorry" (Tina Shafer, Wright, Peter Zizzo) – 4:17
 "I Will Be There" (Silver, Wright) – 3:36
 "Circle of Life" (Mattis Gustafsson, Larry Loftin, Wright) – 4:16

Personnel

 Jeff Allen – bass guitar
 Rick Almeida – drum programming
 Gary Barnum – slide guitar
 Bob Britt – electric guitar
 Jenny Bruce – background vocals
 Bob Cadway – acoustic guitar
 Dana Calitri – background vocals
 Patrick Carroll – drum programming, bass guitar, percussion
 Lisa Cochran – background vocals
 Russ Desalvo – acoustic guitar, electric guitar, keyboard programming, keyboards
 Steven Drake – bass guitar, electric guitar, background vocals
 Howard Emerson – slide guitar, soloist
 Tabitha Fair – background vocals
 Mattias Gustafsson – acoustic guitar, electric guitar
 Blake Havard – acoustic guitar, piano, background vocals
 Mark Hill – bass guitar
 Shane Keister – Fender Rhodes, Hammond organ, piano, Wurlitzer
 Kim Keyes – background vocals
 Wayne Killius – drums
 Curtis King – background vocals
 David Lawbaugh – drum programming, percussion programming
 Tanya Leah – background vocals
 Gerry Leonard – electric guitar
 Larry Loftin – background vocals
 Kami Lyle – trumpet
 Chris McHugh – drums
 Fleming McWilliams – background vocals
 Anthony Miracle – drum programming, keyboard programming
 John Painter – flugelhorn
 Jeff Roach – drum programming, keyboard programming, keyboards
 Chris Rodriguez – background vocals
 Tina Shafer – background vocals
 Marc Shulman – electric guitar
 Eric Silver – berimbau, acoustic guitar, electric guitar, mandolin, oud, saxophone, violin, background vocals
 Randall Stoll – drums
 Chris Willis – background vocals
 Julie Wood – background vocals
 Michelle Wright – acoustic guitar, lead vocals
 Peter Zizzo – drum programming, acoustic guitar, electric guitar

RCA Records albums
Michelle Wright albums
2002 albums